Michael "Mike" Franks (born September 23, 1963) is a former American track and field athlete who competed in the 400-meter dash.

He was the silver medalist in the event at the inaugural 1983 World Championships in Athletics. He was given the Harrison Dillard Award in 1984 for his achievements. While attending Southern Illinois University Carbondale, he took the 400 m title at the 1985 NCAA Men's Indoor Track and Field Championship. That same year he took the gold medal at the 1985 IAAF Grand Prix Final and two further golds at the 1985 IAAF World Cup in the 400 m and 4×400-meter relay events. He was the fastest athlete of 1985 over 400 m with his personal best time of 44.47 seconds.

He competed at the 1987 IAAF World Indoor Championships and secured the bronze medal behind Antonio McKay and Roberto Hernández. Turning to the outdoor season, he won at the 1987 Summer Universiade, taking the 400 m students' title. He was selected as an alternate for the 4×400 m relay at the 1987 World Championships in Athletics and helped set a championship record of 2:59.06 in the semi-finals (which was later improved upon when the Americans took gold in the event final.

References

External links

Living people
1963 births
American male sprinters
Southern Illinois Salukis athletes
World Athletics Championships medalists
Universiade medalists in athletics (track and field)
Universiade gold medalists for the United States
World Athletics Indoor Championships medalists
World Athletics Championships winners
Medalists at the 1987 Summer Universiade